The Kurdistan Region Governorate Council elections of 2005 were held on 31 January 2005, to coincide with the Iraqi legislative elections of January 2005 and the Kurdistan Region legislative elections of January 2005. The elections were held to choose 41 council members for each of the three governorates of Kurdistan Region, that is Dahuk, Erbil and Sulaymaniyah governorates. During the election, the Patriotic Union of Kurdistan (PUK) won a plurality of the votes, however, the Kurdistan Democratic Party (KDP) won a plurality of the council seats.

Results

All governorates

Arbil Governorate

Dohuk Governorate

Sulaymaniyah Governorate

Source: Washington Institute: Provincial Politics in Iraq , pp. 15–16

See also
2005 Iraqi governorate elections

References
 Independent Electoral Commission of Iraq

2005 elections in Iraq
2005 in Iraqi Kurdistan
Elections in Kurdistan Region
January 2005 events in Asia
Governorate elections in Iraq